Begonia truncicola is a species of plant in the family Begoniaceae. It is a vine endemic to Ecuador.  Its natural habitat is subtropical or tropical moist montane forests. It is threatened by habitat loss, the only known natural threat to it.

References

Flora of Ecuador
truncicola
Vulnerable plants
Taxonomy articles created by Polbot